Themes – Volume 2: August 82 – April 85 is box set released by Simple Minds. It was released on 25 September 1990 by Virgin Records.

Track listing

Notes

References

Themes – Volume 2: August 82 – April 85 at The Official Site

1990 compilation albums
Simple Minds compilation albums
Virgin Records compilation albums